A Central Committee of the League of Communists of Yugoslavia was elected by the 11th Congress, and was in session from 1978 until 1982. The committee had 20 members from each of the six individual republics, and 15 members from each of the two autonomous provinces and the Yugoslav People's Army.

Members

Bibliography

XI kongres Saveza komunista Jugoslavije: referat i završna riječ predsjednika Tita, rezoilucije, Statut SKJ. Izdavački centar „Komunist“, Belgrade, 1978.

League of Communists of Yugoslavia